Instytut Sobieskiego (The Sobieski Institute) is a think tank founded in Poland in 2004, known for its political advocacy of the Polish conservative political movement. The Poland's social conservative party Law and Justice , which governed Poland from 2005 to 2007 and which won Poland's 2015 general elections, was inspired by many ideas and projects proposed by the Sobieski Institute.

It is committed to a conservative, liberal state, with strony focus on free market and new technologies, Polish strong presence within the European Union and is an advocate of economic freedom.

The main areas of interest of its experts and analysts are security and defense policy, energy policy, international relations, law, public finance and information and communication technologies.

It publishes reports and comment on economy, law proposals and innovation strategies of Poland and European Union. Used to publish journal Międzynarodowy Przęgląd Polityczny (The International Political Review), which reports on the latest developments in political thought from major neoconservative political centres in Europe and United States.

Former presidents of the Sobieski Institute play important role in Polish public life. Marek Dietl is the CEO of Warsaw Stock Exchange, Paweł Soloch is the Chief of the National Security Office and Paweł Szałamacha is the board member of the National Bank of Poland (Narodowy Bank Polski).

Instytut Sobieskiego is a member of the Stockholm Network.

External links 
 
Międzynarodowy Przegląd Polityczny 

2004 establishments in Poland
Think tanks established in 2004
Think tanks based in Poland
Political and economic think tanks based in the European Union